The United Opposition was an electoral alliance formed between various opposition parties in India ahead of the 2022 elections in India. The United Opposition was first proposed by the Chief Minister of West Bengal, Mamata Banerjee.

Foundation 
To fight against NDA in 2024 Lok Sabha election, the Chief Minister of West Bengal, TMC supremo, Mamata Banerjee.

Party strength

List of United Opposition governments

2022 Presidential elections
The United Opposition nominated Yashwant Sinha, former External Affairs Minister, former Finance Minister, and Trinamool Congress leader, as their presidential candidate for the 2022 Indian presidential election. Later Jharkhand Mukti Morcha (JMM), Bahujan Samaj Party (BSP), Telugu Desam Party (TDP) and both factions of Shiv Sena (SS) supported the NDA nominated candidate Droupadi Murmu for the presidential election instead. Sinha finished in second place in the elections.

2022 Vice Presidential election
The United Opposition nominated Margaret Alva, former Governor of Uttarakhand and Rajasthan, former Union Minister and Congress leader, as their Vice Presidential candidate for the 2022 Indian Vice Presidential election. However, the leading party of the Opposition, AITC, decided to abstain from voting due to insult of the dignity of the party by other parties as they did not consult or seek consent before declaring a VP candidate. Alva finished in second place in the elections.

References

 
2022 establishments in India
Political parties established in 2022